Nevada's 4th Senate district is one of 21 districts in the Nevada Senate. It has been represented by Democrat Dina Neal since 2020, succeeding appointed fellow Democrat Marcia Washington.

Geography and demographics
District 4 covers parts of North Las Vegas, Las Vegas, and Sunrise Manor in Clark County; it also includes North Las Vegas Airport.

The district overlaps with Nevada's 1st and 4th congressional districts, and with the 6th and 7th districts of the Nevada Assembly.

According to the 2010 Census, the 4th district had a total of 128,783 inhabitants – 0.14% above the ideal. The district had a large Hispanic and Latino community: over 45% of the district's inhabitants belonged to one of these groups, second only to the 2nd district. The district's population was also low educated. Over 30% of the adult population did not have a high school diploma, and only 6 percent had a bachelor's degree. The median household income was nearly $15,000 lower than Nevada's average, and over a quarter of the population lived in poverty. It had the second-lowest number of registered voters in the state, after District 2.

Recent election results
Nevada Senators are elected to staggered four-year terms; since 2012 redistricting, the 4th district has held elections in presidential years.

2020

2016
In 2016, incumbent Kelvin Atkinson faced Stephen Harvey Munford, the son of Assemblyman Harvey Munford, in the primary election. The elder Mumford had previously showed interest in running for the district, but declined. Atkinson vastly out-raised Munford, and won the primary election with two-thirds of the vote. He was unopposed in the general election.

2012
In 2012, incumbent Steven Horsford successfully ran for Nevada's 4th congressional district, leaving the 4th Senate district vacant. Three Democrats ran to succeed him: Assemblyman Kelvin Atkinson, businesswoman Katherine Duncan, and parole officer supervisor David Wallace. Atkinson, who was endorsed by the Senate Democratic Caucus, highlighted his own experience, while Duncan noted that Atkinson had to move into the district to run and argued that she knew the community better. Wallace, meanwhile, died of a heart attack a month before the primary, but still appeared on the ballot. Atkinson won the June 12 primary with nearly 70% of the vote.

In the general election, Atkinson faced caretaker and political newcomer Linda West Myers. Atkinson argued that his experience would provide "consistency," while West Myers attacked Atkinson for simultaneously receiving a salary from both the legislature and Clark County after he was fired in 2003. Atkinson nevertheless won with nearly 80% of the vote in the heavily-Democratic district.

Federal and statewide results in District 4

History 
The 4th district was created during the reapportionment of the districts in 2011 after the 2010 Census was held. The new districts went into effect on January 1, 2012 for filing for office and nominating and electing senators. It became effective for all other purposes on November 7 – the day after Election Day, when the new senator terms began. The borders of District 4 are defined in the Nevada Revised Statutes using census tracts, block groups, and blocks. In the 1960s, the 4th district was a multi-member constituency that covered the entirety of Clark County. Since the 1970 census, it has been based around the Las Vegas Historic West Side and southern North Las Vegas.

References

External links 
 
 

4
Clark County, Nevada